In a simple form of communication between two people, such as a short dialog, the speaker's utterance and transmission of speech sounds (or speech signal) to the hearer encompass seven phases of speech, namely:

 neurolinguistic programming
 neuromuscular phase
 organic phase
 aerodynamic phase
 acoustic phase
 neuroreceptive phase
 neurolinguistic identification.

References

Phonetics